John Peter Thielman (May 20, 1879 – January 28, 1928) was a German-American pitcher in Major League Baseball who played from 1905 through 1908 for the St. Louis Cardinals (1905–1906), Cleveland Naps (1907–1908) and Boston Red Sox (1908). He was born in St. Cloud, Minnesota. His younger brother, Henry Thielman, also pitched in the majors.

In a four-season career, Thielman posted a 30–28 record with 158 strikeouts and a 3.16 ERA in 65 appearances, including 56 starts, 56 complete games, three shutouts, and 475⅓ innings of work.

Thielman died at the age of 48 in Minneapolis, Minnesota.

Best seasons
1905 – 15 wins, 87 SO, 3.50 ERA, 242.0 innings
1907 – 11 wins, 56 SO, 2.33 ERA, 166.0 innings

References

External links

Boston Red Sox players
Cleveland Naps players
St. Louis Browns players
Major League Baseball pitchers
Baseball players from Minnesota
1879 births
1928 deaths
American people of German descent
Paris Midlands players
Cedar Rapids Bunnies players
Butte Smoke Eaters players
Manhattan Jaspers baseball players
Spokane Blue Stockings players
Tacoma Tigers players
Jersey City Skeeters players
Newark Sailors players
Rochester Bronchos players
Toronto Maple Leafs (International League) players
Los Angeles (minor league baseball) players
Portland Browns players
Indianapolis Indians players
Louisville Colonels (minor league) players
Oklahoma City Indians players